The Triumph of Michael Strogoff (French: Le triomphe de Michel Strogoff) is a 1961 French-Italian historical adventure film directed by Viktor Tourjansky and starring Curd Jürgens, Capucine and Claude Titre. It is inspired by the 1876 novel Michael Strogoff by Jules Verne. Jürgens had previously played the role in the 1956 film Michel Strogoff.

Cast
 Curd Jürgens as Michel Strogoff
 Capucine as Tatiana Volskaya
 Claude Titre as Igor Vassiliev
 Pierre Massimi as Serge de Bachenberg
 Albert Pierjac as Ivan Colinov
 Daniel Emilfork as 	Ben Routh
 Valéry Inkijinoff as Amektal
 Simone Valère as L'impératrice
 Rico Lopez as Le cavalier
 Georges Lycan as Le Khan
 Jacques Bézard  	
 Raymond Gérôme	
 Pierre Mirat	
 Henri Nassiet

References

Bibliography 
 Goble, Alan. The Complete Index to Literary Sources in Film. Walter de Gruyter, 1999.

External links 
 

1961 films
1961 adventure films
French historical adventure films
Italian historical adventure films
1960s historical adventure films
1960s Italian-language films
Films directed by Victor Tourjansky
Films based on Michael Strogoff
Films set in Russia
Films set in the 19th century
1960s French films
1960s Italian films

fr:Le Triomphe de Michel Strogoff